A  is a bamboo staff which curves slightly, approximately 15 inches (or half a metre) long, which is used as a "symbol of a Zen master's authority" in Zen Buddhism. In contrast to the keisaku, the shippei was often used as a disciplinary measure for meditating monks. It can often be found at the side of a Zen master in a zendo and is also "one of seven items that make up a Zen monk's equipment." It is fashioned out of two pieces of bamboo that are shaped into the form of a spatula (or short bow), wound with rattan, and lacquered.

Sometimes curved in the shape of an S, the shippei may be elaborately decorated with a silk cord or have carvings. It is still "sometimes employed to hit monks".

See also
Keisaku

Explanatory notes

References
Citations

Bibliography

Zen